Birkot HaTorah (The blessings of the Torah) are blessings in Jewish law concerning the giving of the Torah from God to Israel and to study of Torah. According to Jewish law, the blessings are obligatory to bless before Torah study (including the Talmud), and it is customary to bless them every morning prior to any Torah study that will be taught that day.

The order of the blessings
The system of Torah blessings is structured as a series of three sections: 
 In the first part, we bless according to the regular wording of the blessing of the mitzvos: we bless Hashem who sanctified us with His mitzvot and commanded us to occupy ourselves with the study of Torah.
 Then we add a request for success in Torah study: we request that the Torah, which Hashem taught His nation Israel, be pleasant to us, that we merit learning it with desire, and that we and our offspring have the privilege of understanding the depth of its content.
 After the request, another blessing is given as thanksgiving for the giving of the Torah to the people of Israel: we bless and thank Hashem for choosing us from among all the nations and giving us His Torah.
This blessing is also the blessing that blesses every ascendant to the Torah before the reading of the Torah in the synagogue, and also after the recitation blesses the ascendant another blessing with a similar content: "Who gave us his Torah a true doctrine.

The importance of Birkot HaTorah
In the Talmud it is written that one of the reasons for the destruction of the Land of Israel is to know a Rav, the one who studied Torah without first blessing the Birkot HaTorah. Rabbi's explanation is an interpretation of the verse in the book of Jeremiah which describes God answering the question why the Land of Israel was destroyed:"Who is the ish hechacham (wise man), that may understand this? And who is he to whom the mouth of Hashem hath spoken, that he may declare it, for what HaAretz perisheth and is scorched like a midbar, that none passeth through?"

From the simplicity of the Bible it appears that the destruction of the land was due to the departure of the Torah, but Rav requires the duplication of the language "they left my Torah" and "did not follow it", meaning that they did not bless before studying Torah.

Is thought considered speech?
In Berakhot (tractate) Amoraim were divided as to whether contemplation (thought) was considered speech or not. According to Rav Chisda thought is not considered speech, and the evidence for this is that an unclean person is not allowed to say holy things, and he should thought on the words of the food blessing in his mind. Hence a thought is not considered speech and he must ponder it so that he will not be idle from sacred words while the others are engaged in the blessings of praise.
According to Rabina thought is considered speech, and therefore the mishnah commands such a person to ponder in his mind the words of the blessing of food, hence the thought is also considered speech, except that this mitzvah that the body be pure when speaking sacred, Which was in the Mount Sinai where it is the obligatory source to purify before the words of holiness, and since there was talk of holiness, the duty to maintain a pure body is only when speaking of holiness really and not in contemplation.

References

External links
 Birkot HaTorah – The Blessings on the Torah in Peninei Halakha by Rabbi Eliezer Melamed

Shacharit
Siddur of Orthodox Judaism
Hebrew words and phrases in Jewish prayers and blessings
Positive Mitzvoth